11.Pan Arab Games - Cairo, Egypt - November 16–21, 2007

Semi-finals

Finals

References 

Boxing at the Pan Arab Games